Peter of Angoulême (died July 1208), also called Peter of Lydda, was a French prelate who served successively as the chancellor of the Kingdom of Jerusalem, bishop of Tripoli until 1196 and Latin patriarch of Antioch from 1196 to 1208. He was imprisoned after a rebellion against Prince Bohemond IV of Antioch. He died of thirst after he could only drink the oil of his lamp in his prison in Antioch.

References

Sources 

 
 
 

1208 deaths